The 2021 ITF World Tennis Tour Gran Canaria was a professional women's tennis tournament played on outdoor clay courts. It was the first edition of the tournament which was part of the 2021 ITF Women's World Tennis Tour. It took place in San Bartolomé de Tirajana, Spain between 9 and 15 August 2021.

Singles main-draw entrants

Seeds

 1 Rankings are as of 2 August 2021.

Other entrants
The following players received wildcards into the singles main draw:
  Lucía Cortez Llorca
  Jaqueline Cristian
  Ana Lantigua de la Nuez
  Leyre Romero Gormaz

The following player received entry using a junior exempt:
  Victoria Jiménez Kasintseva

The following players received entry from the qualifying draw:
  Elina Avanesyan
  Yvonne Cavallé Reimers
  Bárbara Gatica
  Francisca Jorge
  Park So-hyun
  Maria Timofeeva

The following player received entry as a lucky loser:
  Ashley Lahey

Champions

Singles

 Arantxa Rus def.  Mayar Sherif, 6–4, 6–2

Doubles

  Elina Avanesyan /  Oksana Selekhmeteva def.  Arianne Hartono /  Olivia Tjandramulia, 7–5, 6–2

References

External links
 2021 ITF World Tennis Tour Gran Canaria at ITFtennis.com
 Official website

2021 ITF Women's World Tennis Tour
2021 in Spanish tennis
August 2021 sports events in Spain